Thomas E. Freston (born November 22, 1945) is an American media proprietor, businessman, and financier.

Early life and education
Freston grew up in Rowayton, Connecticut. He received a Bachelor of Arts from Saint Michael's College and an MBA from New York University. Freston began his career advertising at Benton & Bowles, which later merged with D'Arcy. In 1972, after a year of traveling, he moved to South Asia to start a textile and clothing business, Hindu Kush, and worked and lived in New Delhi, India and Kabul, Afghanistan.

Career
Returning to the United States in 1979, he joined the Warner-Amex Satellite Entertainment Company (WASEC), a pioneer in the new field of cable television programming. He was one of the founding members of the team that created a music video channel MTV in 1981. As head of marketing, he worked on the "I Want My MTV" ad campaign that helped make the new network a cultural phenomenon. In 1987, he became the President and CEO of MTV Networks, a job he held for 17 years. MTV Networks launched and operated networks including: Nickelodeon, VH1, Comedy Central, TV Land, Spike, CMT, Logo TV, Noggin, and others.

As CEO of MTV Networks, Freston expanded the company's reach, built an animation studio, produced feature films, and developed large consumer product and digital businesses. Popular brands and shows included: Blue's Clues, Beavis and Butthead, The Adventures of Pete & Pete, SpongeBob SquarePants, Daria, The Daily Show, Jackass, South Park, Drawn Together, Crank Yankers, The Fairly OddParents, Aeon Flux, Chappelle's Show, I Love the..., Behind the Music, Avatar: The Last Airbender, The Colbert Report, Wonder Showzen, The Ren & Stimpy Show, The Real World, Dora the Explorer, Rugrats, and Star Trek series (from Generation to Deep Space Nine).

Viacom
In 2004, after Viacom President & COO Mel Karmazin stepped down, Freston was named Co-President & Co-COO of Viacom (along with Leslie Moonves). Freston oversaw MTV Networks, Paramount Pictures, Famous Music Publishing, and Simon & Schuster.

In January 2006, Viacom split into two separate companies: Viacom led by Freston and CBS Corporation headed by Moonves.

In September 2006, Viacom chairman Sumner Redstone stunned the entertainment industry when he fired Freston from the position of CEO. One of the chief reasons for the move was that Freston hadn’t moved decisively enough to buy MySpace, which was then the most popular social networking site; instead Rupert Murdoch's News Corporation purchased the site for $580 million. Redstone believed that the failure to acquire MySpace contributed to the 20% drop in Viacom’s stock price in 2006 up to the date of Freston’s ouster. Freston's successor as CEO, Philippe Dauman, was quoted as saying “never, ever let another competitor beat us to the trophy”. Redstone told interviewer Charlie Rose that losing MySpace had been “humiliating,” adding, “MySpace was sitting there for the taking for $500 million.” Murdoch's company ended up selling Myspace, which had largely declined along with the rise of rival social networking website Facebook, in 2012; News Corp's sale price at the time was $35 million.

Post-Viacom
Freston is currently the principal of Firefly3 LLC, a consulting and investment company. In January 2015, he became a senior advisor to The Raine Group, a boutique merchant bank.

Personal life
In 1980, Freston married Margaret Ellen Badali. They had two children, Andrew (b.1985) and Gilbert (b. 1990). They later divorced.

In 1998, Freston married Kathy Freston, a former model, self-help author, and health and wellness expert. They divorced in 2014.

Bibliography

References

External links
 
 

1945 births
20th-century American businesspeople
21st-century American businesspeople
American chief executives in the media industry
American expatriates in Afghanistan
American expatriates in India
American television executives
Businesspeople from Connecticut
Living people
New America (organization)
New York University Stern School of Business alumni
Paramount Global people
People from Norwalk, Connecticut
Saint Michael's College alumni